Lani Jackson is a New Zealand stuntwoman best known for her work in The Lord of the Rings film trilogy.

Filmography

 The Lord of the Rings: The Return of the King (2003): Stunt Performer
 The Last Samurai (2003): Stunt Performer
 The Locals (2003): Stunts
 The Lord of the Rings: The Two Towers (2002): Stunt Performer
 Harry Potter and the Chamber of Secrets (2002): Stunt Performer (uncredited)
 The Lord of the Rings: The Fellowship of the Ring (2001): Stunts/Stunt double for Liv Tyler (uncredited)

External links

New Zealand stunt performers
Year of birth missing (living people)
Living people
Women stunt performers